"Lucky Star" is a song by Swedish singers Carola Häggkvist & Andreas Johnson. It was released as digital download on 15 January 2008 in Sweden. It reached number 13 on the Swedish Singles Chart

Charts

Release history

References

2008 singles
Andreas Johnson songs
Male–female vocal duets
2008 songs
Carola Häggkvist songs
Song articles with missing songwriters
Warner Music Group singles